Hum Tum is a 2022 Pakistani Ramadan special television comedy drama series, written by Saima Akram Chaudhry, directed by Danish Nawaz, developed by Shahzad Javed, Head of Content, HUM TV and produced by Momina Duraid under banner MD Productions. The series starring Ahad Raza Mir, Ramsha Khan, Sarah Khan and Junaid Khan as main protagonists. 

The series revolves around two houses in one neighborhood where one house has intelligent girls while the other possesses good mannered boys. It aired on Hum TV from 3 April 2022 to 3 May 2022, with the last episode airing on the first day of Eid-ul-Fitr. The series received critical acclaim.

Plot

Adam Sultan and Neha Qutub ud Din are childhood rivals and neighbors. Adam's elder brother Sarmad is a professional cook and owns a restaurant, and Sarmad has a crush on Neha's elder sister Maha. Maha is fond of yoga and keeping her body in shape and taking care of her diet. Qutub ud Din, Neha and Maha's father, pays more attention to Adam than his own daughters since he has always lamented not having a son. Adam, whose own father has neglected fatherly duties of financial and emotional care all their lives, deeply respects and cares for Qutub as well.

Since childhood, Adam and Neha have shared a mutual dislike, constantly bickering and playing pranks. Both Adam and Neha are very intelligent and are liked by all professors in their university except Professor Jabir who dislikes Professor Qutub ud Din and thinks he favors Neha and Adam. In an attempt to one up each other, Neha and Adam regularly try to get the other in trouble at college and at home. On the result day Adam gets highest GPA while Neha loses her marks because of Professor Jabir as he dislike her. Neha plans to revenge professor Jabir. Neha tells Sasha(her younger sister) to hack professor Jabir's account. After hacking Neha posts an apology from professor Jabir to her. The dean appreciates professor Jabir's apology, after seeing the post because of this dean approves his Germany research which was denied by the management many times. Going to Germany was professor Jabir's dream.

As a result professor Jabir goes off to Germany for research work and is replaced by his own son, Sarim. At professor Jabir's recommendation of Neha as a brilliant student, Sarim starts spending time with Neha, helping her with her chemistry project with Adam. Adam begins to feel jealous and ignored by both Neha and Qutub in Sarim's presence. Soon, Adam and Sarmad's father Sultan goes to Qutub's house to propose Sarmad and Maha's be wed. At first, Qutub is skeptical about this since Maha is a divorcee but Maha says to her father to do what he thinks is right for her.

At Sarmad and Maha's mehandi, Jabir comes back and asks Qutub for Sarim and Neha to be officially engaged, which Adam overhears and becomes saddened by. Adam then realizes that he has fallen in love with Neha. Qutub asks Neha for her decision regarding Sarim's proposal to which Neha responds positively, to please her father. After Sarmad and Maha's marriage, the preparations begin for Sarim and Neha's wedding, but Neha finds out about Adam's love for her, which bemuses her. Unbeknownst to Adam, she uses this opportunity to test Adam's patience and love for her. Through this, Adam and Neha begin to talk and become friends.

At the university, Adam gets into a fight with some people that were insulting Neha. Neha comes in to stop the fight, while Sarim doesn't get involved. At Sarim and Neha's engagement, Neha confronts Adam, but Sarim interrupts. Afterwards, when Sarem takes Neha's hand, hurting her, Neha asks he let go of her hand. Adam intervenes, but Qutub gets mad at Adam for being disrespectful. Sarim realizes that he isn't worthy of Neha and breaks his engagement with Neha.

Adam meets with Neha after hearing this, and they both confess their love for each other. Then, Sarmad and Maha find out they are having a baby, and they both celebrate. So both couples get their happy ending, with Adam and Neha deciding to be with each other and Sarmad and Maha celebrating their upcoming child.

Cast

Main cast
 Ahad Raza Mir as Adam Sultan: Qutub's "favorite" student, Neha's rival later turned love interest, Helps his brother in business, Maha's brother-in-law.
 Ramsha Khan as Neha Qutub ud Din: A class topper chemistry student, She has multiple issues with her father's rules but loves him dearly, Adam's rival later turned love interest, Sarmad's sister-in-law.
 Junaid Khan as Sarmad Sultan: Adam's elder brother, Owner and chef at his own restaurant, Maha's husband.
 Sarah Khan as Maha Qutub ud Din/Maha Sarmad Sultan: Neha's elder sister, A psychology student, Also a yoga and fitness freak, Sarmad's wife.

Recurring cast
 Adnan Jaffar as Professor Qutub ud Din: Safi's son, Ulfat's husband, Father of three daughters; Maha Neha and Sasha, Chemistry professor and Head of Department of Adam and Neha in university.
 Syed Mohammad Ahmed as Safiullah "Daddu Handsome", a widower TikToker who wants to have second marriage, without letting his son Qutub know.
 Arjumand Rahim as Ulfat Qutub ud Din, Neha's mother. Ulfat is married to her cousin Qutub, who is her mother's brother Safi's son. She is only matric pass and not a good cook.
 Farhan Ally Agha as Sultan: Adam and Sarmad's father, A well-educated jobless gambler & Childhood friend of Qutub.
 Uzma Beg as Tamanna Begum "Nano", Haleema's widowed mother, an marketing online business of marriage bureau but has a record of failed marriages including Maha's first marriage.
 Munazzah Arif as Haleema Sultan, Adam's mother who also loves Qutub's daughters as they are good in studies. Haleema is married to her cousin Sultan who is her mother's sister's son. She has a problem of forgetting things.
 Omer Shahzad as Sarim: Professor Jabir's son, Likes Neha wants to marry her and guides her in the chemistry project.
 Anoushey Rania Khan as Sasha Qutub ud Din: Maha and Neha's younger sister, A passionate hacker. Miliha's class fellow and best friend.
 Aina Asif as Maliha "Mili" Sultan: Sarmad and Adam's younger sister, A martial arts student, A tomboy, Sasha's class fellow and best friend.

Guest cast
 Saife Hassan as Professor Jabir, Qutub's colleague and rival at the university who teaches chemistry to Neha's batch. His rivalry ends when his request for visiting abroad for research work gets approved from the university after Neha attempts to forge her result using Sasha's hacking skills on his account. In response, he wants Neha to marry his son Sarim.
 Salma Asim as Professor Saleha, Qutub's colleague at the university.
 Ayaz Khan as a professor at the university.
 Danish Ali as Omar, Adam's friend at the university. 
 Hina Rizvi as Nargis, Safi's failed infatuation courtesy of Tamanna's marriage bureau.
 Ayesha Sohail as Hira, Neha's friend at the university.
 Bilal Cuto as Ibtehaj, Saleha's son and a prospective rishta for Maha.

Production
In December 2021, writer Saima Akram Chaudhry revealed in an interview that one of her upcoming Ramadan play is titled Hum Tum, which will began shooting in January. In January 2022, it was reported that Ahad Raza Mir and Ramsha Khan joined the leading cast while Danish Nawaz will direct the series which made this his second collaboration with writer after the 2021 series Chupke Chupke. Next month, it was confirmed that YouTuber Danish Ali has joined the cast in a prominent role as his television debut. Later in same month, the casting of Sarah Khan and Junaid Khan was also confirmed, all in leading roles. Besides the leading cast, Arjumand Rahim, Adnan Jaffar, Munazza Arif, Syed Mohammad Ahmed, Uzma Beg and Farhan Ally Agha were chosen to portray supporting roles.

Filming of the university scenes took place on location at Salim Habib University in Karachi.

Soundtrack

The title song was sung by Ali Zafar and Damia Farooq. The song was composed Naveed Nashad with lyrics written by Qamar Nashad.

Reception
It received praise from the audience for the portrayal of the girls as independent, breaking gender stereotypes and tackling issues such as marriage of a divorcee, inheritance division in case of no male heirs and mental health in light manner.

Apart from critical acclaim, the drama responded well on youtube and trended for several days. It got TRPs of 4-5 per episode, with highest of 5.6 TRP and lowest of 3.7 TRP. It ended with 4.1 TRPs.

References

External link
 
Pakistani drama television series
Urdu-language television shows
Ramadan special television shows
2022 Pakistani television series debuts
2022 Pakistani television series endings